= Civic Planetarium of Lecco =

Planetarium in Lecco, Italy

- Planetario civico di Lecco
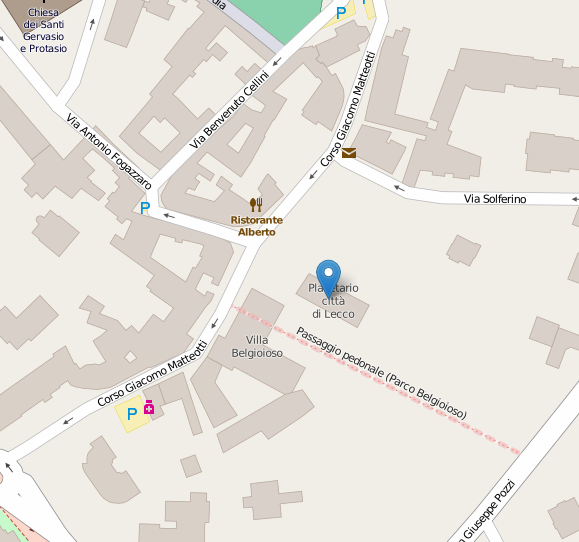
- Interactive map of Civic Planetarium of Lecco
- Address: Corso Matteotti 32, Lecco, Italy
- Coordinates: 45.8595366°N 9.3976747°E
- Type: Planetarium

Construction
- Built: May 2004

Website
- www.museilecco.org/planetario.htm

The Civic Planetarium of Lecco (Planetario civico di Lecco or Planetario Città di Lecco), also known as the City Planetarium, is located within Palazzo Belgioioso in Lecco, Italy. Planetarium is part of Natural History Museum of Lecco.

The purpose of the planetarium is to be a place for specialists and people interested in astronomy in the region. It organizes meetings and lessons in which experiences and expertise are shared.

== Description ==
The Amateur Astronomers Group "DEEP SPACE Lecco" helps manage the observatory. The instrument consists of a projector and an aluminum dome, which acts as a screen. It can be used to simulate the movement of celestial bodies on the sky. The dome is eight meters in diameter and can seat sixty observers. Often the shows are accompanied by a lecturer.

The planetarium accelerates the movement of the moon and stars in order to allow observation of processes that normally take days or months. The Planetarium building consists of various rooms: the ticket office, a library for members, a room dedicated to the exhibition of astronomical instruments and a media room used for conferences.

The astronomical dome in the Planetarium was inaugurated on September 19, 2011. The small dome on the roof of the building comes from Canada and inside there is a Celestron C11 telescope, a catadioptric remotely controlled Schmidt-Cassegrain, so they can observe the whole sky even in the conference room.

As of July 2016 the director of the planetarium is Erasmo Bardelli. The ticket costs 3 euros.
